The 2021–22 South Pacific cyclone season was a near average tropical cyclone season within the South Pacific Ocean to the east of 160°E. The season officially started from November 1, 2021, and officially ended on April 30, 2022, however a tropical cyclone could form at any time between July 1, 2021, and June 30, 2022, and would count towards the season total. During the season, tropical cyclones will be officially monitored by the Fiji Meteorological Service, Australian Bureau of Meteorology and New Zealand's MetService. The United States Armed Forces through the Joint Typhoon Warning Center (JTWC) will also monitor the basin and issue unofficial warnings for American interests. The FMS attaches a number and an F suffix to tropical disturbances that form in or move into the basin while the JTWC designates significant tropical cyclones with a number and a P suffix. The BoM, FMS and MetService all use the Australian Tropical Cyclone Intensity Scale and estimate windspeeds over a period of ten minutes, while the JTWC estimated sustained winds over a 1-minute period, which are subsequently compared to the Saffir–Simpson hurricane wind scale (SSHWS).


Seasonal forecasts

Ahead of the cyclone season formally starting, the Fiji Meteorological Service (FMS), Australian Bureau of Meteorology (BoM), New Zealand's MetService and National Institute of Water and Atmospheric Research (NIWA) and various other Pacific Meteorological services, all contributed towards the Island Climate Update tropical cyclone outlook that was released during October 2021. The outlook took into account the ENSO neutral conditions that had been observed across the Pacific and analogue seasons, that had ENSO neutral and La Nina conditions occurring during the season. The outlook called for a near-average number of tropical cyclones for the 2021–22 season, with nine to twelve named tropical cyclones, predicted to occur between 135°E and 120°W, compared to an average of just over 10. At least four of the tropical cyclones were expected to intensify further and become severe tropical cyclones, while it was noted that a Category 5 severe tropical cyclone could occur during the season.

In addition to contributing towards the Island Climate Update outlook, the FMS and the BoM issued their own seasonal forecasts for the South Pacific region. The BoM issued two seasonal forecasts for the Southern Pacific Ocean, for their self-defined eastern and western regions of the South Pacific Ocean. They predicted that the Western region between 142.5°E and 165°E, had a 59% chance of seeing activity above its average of 4 tropical cyclones. The BoM also predicted that the Eastern Region between 165°E and 120°W, had a 46% chance of seeing activity above its average of 6 tropical cyclones. Within their outlook the FMS predicted that between four and six tropical cyclones would occur within the basin compared to an average of around 7. At least one of these tropical cyclones was expected to intensify further and become a Category 3 or higher severe tropical cyclone.

Seasonal summary

The season began on mid-December 2021 with the arrival of Tropical Cyclone Ruby from the Australian region as a Category 2 tropical cyclone, before making landfall in New Caledonia and dissipate. Tropical Disturbance 02F then developed late on the same month between Vanuatu and Fiji and moved westwards towards New Caledonia before dissipating. By January, Tropical Disturbance 03F formed, which would later become Severe Tropical Cyclone Cody. Cody then moved near Fiji before moving southwards again and weaken. Three more systems would later form during the month, with the first system, 04F, becoming a tropical depression as it moved west before weakening. The second system, 05F, developed between the southern Cook Islands and French Polynesia and remained a tropical disturbance. The third system, 06F, formed between Vanuatu and New Caledonia and also remained a tropical disturbance while moving southeast.

By February, Tropical Low 16U moved over the basin from the Australian region, and was redesignated as Tropical Disturbance 07F. It remained as a disturbance while moving southeast. Tropical Low 18U would also move over the basin, and be redesignated as 08F. 08F would later develop into Severe Tropical Cyclone Dovi, the strongest cyclone of the season. Dovi would later affect New Zealand as an extratropical cyclone. Late on the same month, Tropical Disturbance 09F would form near New Caledonia, and intensify into Tropical Cyclone Eva. Tropical Cyclone Fili would later form on the month of April, peaking as a Category 2 tropical cyclone before moving near New Caledonia and dissipating, and Tropical Cyclone Gina would form in the off-season, in the month of May, peaking as a Category 1 tropical cyclone before dissipating.

Systems

Tropical Cyclone Ruby 

On December 13, Tropical Cyclone Ruby moved into the basin from the Australian region, as a Category 2 tropical cyclone on the Australian scale. Late on the same day, it made landfall on New Caledonia, and weakened as it emerged from the country. The FMS downgraded Ruby into a Category 1 tropical cyclone, and the JTWC issued their final advisory shortly thereafter. Ruby crossed into the MetService's area of responsibility, where it became an extratropical cyclone on December 15.

Tropical Disturbance 02F 

The FMS designated the tropical disturbance as 02F. Deep convection associated with the system persisted on a convergence line, away from the system's low-level circulation center. By December 20 the FMS issuing their final warning.

Severe Tropical Cyclone Cody 

On January 5, the FMS reported that a tropical disturbance had developed. It was designated as 03F.

03F caused heavy rain in Fiji as a tropical depression, leading to flooding and infrastructure damage. 4,000 people had to be evacuated from their homes. On January 10, a man drowned in Fiji while attempting to cross a flooding river.

Tropical Depression 04F

Tropical Disturbance 05F

Tropical Disturbance 06F

Tropical Disturbance 07F

Severe Tropical Cyclone Dovi 

During February 6, Tropical Low 18U moved into the basin from the Australian region and was classified as Tropical Disturbance 08F by the FMS. On February 8, the JTWC issued a Tropical Cyclone Formation Alert (TCFA) for the system, it was upgraded to a tropical depression by the FMS. The next day, the JTWC issued its first warning on the system, classifying it as Tropical Cyclone 11P and the FMS reported that the depression had developed into a Category 1 tropical cyclone on the Australian scale and named it Dovi.

On February 10, Dovi continued to move south-southwest and made landfall on Isle of Pines in New Caledonia, where it became slow-moving and intensified into a category 2 system. The FMS reported that the system intensified to a Category 3 severe tropical cyclone, with 10-minute sustained winds of 65 kn (120 km/h; 75 mph) while the JTWC reported that Dovi had become equivalent to a Category 1 system on the Saffir–Simpson hurricane wind scale (SSHWS) as a defined eye began to clear on infrared satellite imagery.

At around 00:00 UTC on February 11, Dovi moved into MetService's area of responsibility and the FMS ceased advisories on the system. Three hours later, MetService subsequently reported that cyclone reached to a category 4 system. Despite MetService reporting a peak of 10-minute sustained winds of 95 kn (175 km/h; 110 mph), the JTWC only reported a peak of 1-minute sustained winds of 80 kn (150 km/h; 90 mph). Dovi weakened into a Category 3 system as it began extratropical transition, with the JTWC issuing their final advisory that day. MetService reclassified it as an extratropical low the next day. On February 12 UTC (Sunday 13 February NZDT), Dovi made landfall as an extratropical storm in the Waitomo District in New Zealand's North Island. Severe weather was felt across much of the island, with heavy rain causing flooding and slips.

Dovi caused widespread flooding in both Vanuatu and New Caledonia, with the heavy winds also bringing down power and telephone lines in New Caledonia. Authorities in New Caledonia issued a rescue alert across the territory. The town of Featherston was placed under a boil water notice after flooding contaminated the town's water supply. Heavy wind brought down trees, damaging property and causing widespread power outages, while the Auckland Harbour Bridge was closed to traffic. The worst affected regions were Wellington, Taranaki, Waikato, and Auckland. $54,840,000 NZD of damage was done by Dovi in New Zealand. One person was seriously injured in Raglan after a tree fell onto the car they were driving.

Tropical Cyclone Eva

Tropical Cyclone Fili 

The next day, in an unofficial bulletin, the JTWC classified the system as a "tropical cyclone", when it reached 35 knots on the Saffir-Simpson scale. 

MetService issued red heavy rain warnings in Gisborne and Wairoa as the cyclone approached the country. Fili brought heavy rain and wind to areas around East Cape on April 12 and 13, leading to flooding, downed trees, power outages, and closed roads.

Tropical Cyclone Gina 

During May 16, the FMS reported that Tropical Disturbance 11F had developed, about 600 km (375 mi) to the northeast of Port Vila, Vanuatu. At this time, the system had a broad low-level circulation centre, which had light winds of 5–10 mph (10–20 km/h) associated with it. Over the next day, atmospheric convection consolidated over the low level circulation center, within a favourable environment for further development with robust outflow, low-moderate vertical windshear and warm sea-surface temperatures of around 29–30 °C (84–86 °F). As a result, the JTWC issued a tropical cyclone formation alert (TCFA) on the disturbance and warned that there was a high potential for the disturbance to develop into a tropical cyclone, as it moved south-westwards towards Vanuatu. The FMS subsequently reported that the disturbance had developed into a tropical depression, while it was located about 435 km (270 mi) to the northeast of Port Vila. The JTWC subsequently cancelled the TCFA during May 18, after the depression had veered westwards from its south-westwards track, into an area of high vertical wind shear, while its low level circulation became fully exposed and decoupled from its central deep overcast.

Later that day, the JTWC initiated advisories on the depression and designated it as Tropical Cyclone 26P, after a fresh area of atmospheric convection had started to grow and expand over the low-level circulation. The FMS subsequently reported that the depression had developed into a category 1 tropical cyclone and named it Gina, after winds of 45 mph (75 km/h) had been observed near the systems centre. The newly named system subsequently struggled to overcome the effects of the vertical windshear and maintain deep persistent atmospheric convection, as it moved south-westwards along the subtropical ridge of high pressure. Gina dissipated on May 21.

Heavy rain associated with Gina caused flooding to be reported in various parts of Vanuatu, including at Port Vila's Bauerfield Airport which caused both domestic and international flights to be cancelled.

Other system

The small storm dissipated the next day. Similar to previous storms that formed in this region, it was unofficially named Humberto by researchers, in honor of Humberto Fuenzalida.

Storm names

With tropical depressions intensifying into a tropical cyclone between the Equator and 25°S and between 160°E - 120°W named by the FMS. However should a tropical depression intensify to the south of 25°S between 160°E and 120°W it will be named in conjunction with the FMS by MetService. Should a tropical cyclone move out of the basin and into the Australian region it will retain its original name. The names that were used for 2021–22 season are listed below:

If a tropical cyclone enters the South Pacific basin from the Australian region basin (west of 160°E), it will retain the name assigned to it by the BoM. The following storms were named in this manner:

Ruby

Season effects
This table lists all the storms that developed in the South Pacific to the east of longitude 160°E during the 2021–22 season. It includes their intensity on the Australian tropical cyclone intensity scale, duration, name, landfalls, deaths, and damages. All data is taken from RSMC Nadi and/or TCWC Wellington, and all of the damage figures are in 2021 or 2022 USD.

See also

Weather of 2021 and 2022
List of Southern Hemisphere cyclone seasons
Tropical cyclones in 2021 and 2022
Atlantic hurricane seasons: 2021, 2022
Pacific hurricane seasons: 2021, 2022
Pacific typhoon seasons: 2021, 2022
North Indian Ocean cyclone seasons: 2021, 2022
2021–22 South-West Indian Ocean cyclone season
2021–22 Australian region cyclone season
Unusual areas of tropical cyclone formation
Subtropical Cyclone Katie
Subtropical Cyclone Lexi

References

External links

 
South Pacific cyclone seasons
Tropical cyclones in 2022